Jim Menzies may refer to:

Jim Menzies, character in Another Country (1984 film)
Jim Menzies (writer), see Elizabeth Dennis

See also
James Menzies (disambiguation)